Dawkinsia rohani is a species of ray-finned fish in the genus Dawkinsia. It is endemic to the Western Ghats and inhabits the hill streams of Kanyakumari District in Tamil Nadu draining into the Arabian Sea.

Etymology
The fish is named in honor of Rohan Pethiyagoda (b. 1955), in recognition of his work on the freshwater fishes of India and Sri Lanka.

References 

Dawkinsia
Endemic fauna of the Western Ghats
Freshwater fish of India
Taxa named by Karunakaran Rema Devi
Taxa named by J. D. Marcus Knight
Fish described in 2010